Carry Me Across the Water is a novel by the American writer Ethan Canin.

It is an elegiac novel that tells the story of August Kleinman, a 78-year-old former Pittsburgh brewery owner who remembers episodes from his life—from his escape from Nazi Germany to his life of poverty in New York to his rise to riches in industrial Pittsburgh. Both the Boston Globe and The Times selected it as a Best Book of 2001.

References

2001 American novels
Novels set in Pittsburgh
Random House books